Asiamordella furvis is a species of beetles in the family Mordellidae, the only species in the genus Asiamordella.

References

Mordellidae genera
Monotypic Cucujiformia genera